Gubernatorial elections in 1997 took place in 14 regions of the Russian Federation.

Background 
In January–March 1997, the process of holding first gubernatorial elections in all regions of Russia, which began in September 1996, was practically completed. By January 1, six governors-appointees remained in power: Leonid Roketsky in Tyumen Oblast, Yury Lyashko in Amur Oblast, Bolot Ayushiyev in ABAO, Nikolai Sevryugin in Tula Oblast, Mikhail Kislyuk in Kemerovo Oblast and Anatoly Yakimov in Evenkia. By April only Kislyuk remained in office, instead of whom Aman Tuleyev was appointed on June 30.

In the first quarter of 1997, re-elections of presidents of four republics (Mari El, Adygea, Kabardino-Balkaria, Tuva) and presidential elections in the breakaway Chechen Republic of Ichkeria were also held. In the summer, early elections were held for the governors of Nizhny Novgorod and Irkutsk Oblasts after resignations of Boris Nemtsov and Yury Nozhikov, and in the fall the head of Kemerovo Oblast administration was elected.

By decision of the legislative assemblies, re-elections of the head of the administration of Oryol Oblast and the head of the Komi Republic were held six months ahead of schedule. In December, the re-election in Chuvashia and the first election of the Head of the Altai Republic took place.

Results

References

Sources
 Gubernatorial elections — 1997, politika.su

Gubernatorial elections in Russia
1997 elections in Russia